Fresco-Le-Raye is a cartoon character created by UK cartoonist J Edward Oliver.
Fresco had an alter ego, a super hero named Superdinosaur.

After the strip closed, Jack Oliver tried to interest newspapers in a daily strip about the character.
However, after publication of some of these strips on the JEO website, there was renewed interest and Oliver sent out a weekly strip by e-mail to subscribers.

External links 
weekly strip

British comics characters